Joshua Lundstram (born 19 February 1999) is an English professional footballer who most recently played as a midfielder for Altrincham.

Career
Lundstram graduated from Crewe's academy in summer 2017.

He gained experience in non-league football with loan moves to Sandbach United, Newcastle Town and Nuneaton Borough, the latter for a month in January 2019. He was given a one-year contract, with an optional one-year extension, in May 2019.

In November 2019, Lundstram went on a month's loan to Kidsgrove Athletic before joining Altrincham on a similar deal in January 2020. His loan to Altrincham was firstly extended by a month, then to the end of the season. He was part of the Altrincham side that won the National League North Play-offs that year.

Lundstram made his first-team debut for Crewe in the opening group game of the 2020–21 EFL Trophy away to Bolton Wanderers, playing 80 minutes before being replaced by Oliver Finney. He made his league debut the following Saturday, 12 September 2020, at home to Charlton Athletic, replacing Finney for the final 15 minutes. However, in October 2020 he was sidelined after suffering a stress fracture to his ankle, eventually making a return to light training in February 2021, and returning to first-team action with another substitute appearance in the final match of the season.

On 13 May 2021, Crewe announced that it had offered Lundstram a new contract; he signed a two-year deal in June 2021, and made his first league start for Crewe on 7 August 2021 against Cheltenham Town at Gresty Road, playing the pass that set up Crewe's goal in a 1–1 draw.

On 17 December 2021, Lundstram joined National League side Solihull Moors on a 28-day loan deal until 14 January 2022. He made his debut in Solihull's 1–0 win at AFC Fylde in the fourth round of the FA Trophy on 18 December, and then made one league appearance, against Stockport County on 28 December 2021.

On 28 May 2022, Crewe announced Lundstram would be joining Altrincham permanently for an undisclosed fee on 1 July 2022.

Career statistics

References

1999 births
Living people
English footballers
Footballers from Stoke-on-Trent
Association football midfielders
Crewe Alexandra F.C. players
Newcastle Town F.C. players
Kidsgrove Athletic F.C. players
Nuneaton Borough F.C. players
Altrincham F.C. players
Solihull Moors F.C. players
National League (English football) players
Northern Premier League players
North West Counties Football League players